Roberto González Bayón (born 8 January 2001), commonly known as Rober, is a Spanish professional footballer who plays as a winger for Deportivo Alavés, on loan from Real Betis.

Club career
Born in Mérida, Badajoz, Extremadura, Rober joined Real Betis' youth setup in 2013, from Mérida CF. On 8 June 2017, he signed his first professional contract with the latter club, running until 2020.

On 20 August 2017, aged just 16, Rober made his senior debut with the reserves by starting and scoring the opener in a 4–1 Segunda División B home routing of CF Lorca Deportiva. He was a regular starter for the B's during the campaign, which ended in relegation.

On 1 November 2018, Rober made his first team debut at the age of 17, coming on as a late substitute for Takashi Inui in a 1–0 away defeat of Racing de Santander, for the season's Copa del Rey. The following 18 January, he renewed his contract until 2024, with a release clause set on €25 million.

On 3 September 2020, Rober was loaned to Segunda División side UD Las Palmas, for one year. He made his professional debut on 12 September 2020, starting in a 1–0 away loss against CD Leganés.

Rober scored his first professional goal on 3 October 2020, netting the opener in a 2–1 home win against UD Logroñés. The following 1 April, he scored a hat-trick in a 6–1 home routing of CD Lugo, and returned to Betis in July 2021 after scoring eight goals in 30 appearances.

Rober made his La Liga debut on 14 August 2021, replacing fellow youth graduate Rodri in a 1–1 away draw against RCD Mallorca. The following 14 January, he returned to Las Palmas on loan for the remainder of the season.

On 1 September 2022, Rober was loaned to second division side Deportivo Alavés, for one year.

Career statistics

Club

References

External links

2001 births
Living people
People from Mérida, Spain
Sportspeople from the Province of Badajoz
Spanish footballers
Footballers from Extremadura
Association football forwards
Spain youth international footballers
La Liga players
Segunda División players
Segunda División B players
Tercera División players
Betis Deportivo Balompié footballers
Real Betis players
UD Las Palmas players
Deportivo Alavés players